Judy of Rogue's Harbor is a 1920 American silent drama film directed by William Desmond Taylor and starring Mary Miles Minter. The film is based on the novel of the same name by Grace Miller White, with a scenario by Clara Beranger. It was produced by Famous Players-Lasky and distributed through Realart and Paramount Pictures. As with many of Minter's features, it is thought to be a lost film.

Plot

As described in various film magazine reviews, Judy (Minter), is a young girl living in poverty in Rogue's Harbor with her "Grandpap" Ketchel (Roberts), Olive (Ridgeway) and Denny (Lee), whom she believes to be her sister and cousin respectively. "Grandpap" is consistently cruel, to Denny especially, and he is aided in this cruelty by Jim Schuckles (Sears), who hopes to wed Judy. Judy's confidante is the mysterious "Lady of the Roses" (King), to whom she eventually brings Denny to keep him safe from "Grandpap" and Jim.

Meanwhile, Governor Kingsland (Standing) comes to visit the area, along with his grandson Teddy (Meredith), who falls in love with Judy. Through Olive, who is now pregnant with Jim Shuckles' child, Judy finds out that Jim is plotting to throw a bomb at Governor Kingsland. She saves the Governor's life, and brings him to the house of the Lady of the Roses to keep him safe.

Here it transpires that Judy is in fact the daughter of the Governor's deceased friend, and the heiress to a fortune; not only that, but the Lady of the Roses is her mother. The Governor had lied in an attempt to keep Judy's fortune to himself, telling the Lady of the Roses that the child was dead and placing her with "Grandpap" Ketchel. Judy is happily reunited with her real family and, once she has arranged the marriage of Jim and Olive, she is free to wed Teddy Kingsland.

The April–May 1920 edition of "Motion Picture Classic" features a detailed fiction adaptation of the film, complete with several stills from the picture. The March 27th, 1920 edition of Motion Picture News lists a musical cue sheet for the film.

Cast
Mary Miles Minter as Judy
Charles Meredith as Lt. Teddy Kingsland
Herbert Standing as Governor Kingsland
Theodore Roberts as Grandpap Ketchel
Clo King as Lady of the Roses
Fritzi Ridgeway as Olive Ketchel
Allan Sears as Jim Shuckles
Frankie Lee as Denny
George Periolat as Peter Kingsland

References

External links

 

1920 films
1920 drama films
1920s English-language films
Silent American drama films
American silent feature films
American black-and-white films
Famous Players-Lasky films
Films directed by William Desmond Taylor
Films based on American novels
Films based on works by Grace Miller White
Lost American films
Paramount Pictures films
1920 lost films
Lost drama films
1920s American films